São Miguel do Aleixo is a municipality located in the Brazilian state of Sergipe. Its population was 3,947 (2020) and its area is 145 km².

References

Municipalities in Sergipe